Orval may refer to:

 Orval, Cher, a commune of the Cher département in France
 Orval, Manche, a former commune of the Manche département, in France (now merged with Montchaton into Orval-sur-Sienne)
 Orval-sur-Sienne, a commune of the Manche département, in France 
 Orval, a community within the French commune of Montigny-Lengrain
 Orval, Rùm, a hill on Rùm, Highland, Scotland
 Orval Abbey - Abbaye Notre-Dame d'Orval, a Trappist monastery in Wallonia, Belgium
 Orval Brewery, a brewery located in the Trappist Abbaye Notre-Dame d'Orval
 Orval, a beer produced by the brewery in the Trappist Abbaye Notre-Dame d'Orval
 Orval H. Caldwell (February 15, 1895–February 18, 1972), Chicago-area painter and one-time president of the Art Institute of Chicago
 Orval Faubus, governor of the U.S. state of Arkansas 1955-1967
 Orval Grove, an American baseball player

See also
Orville (disambiguation)